Events in the year 1929 in Turkey.

Parliament
 3rd Parliament of Turkey

Incumbents
President – Kemal Atatürk
Prime Minister – İsmet İnönü

Ruling party and the main opposition
 Ruling party – Republican People's Party (CHP)

Cabinet
5th government of Turkey

Events
21 January – Great fire in Istanbul
24 March – Bankruptcy law
16 April: Women are given the right to vote in municipal elections.
23 April – To commemorate the opening of the Turkish parliament was established as the Children's Day.
1 July – First intercity telephone line between Ankara and İstanbul
11 October – The maintenance of the Turkish battleship Yavuz was completed
25 October – First international air mail (Between İstanbul and Berlin)

Births
7 February – Aysel Gürel, lyricist
13 February – Kenan Erim, archaeologist  
18 February – Ertem Eğilmez, film director and producer
1 March – Nida Tüfekçi, musician
3 March – Mithat Bayrak, wrestler
29 April – Ferit Tüzün, composer 
5 May – Ayhan Işık, actor
7 June – Basri Dirimlili, footballer
11 June – Ayhan Şahenk, business man
24 July – Gülriz Sururi, theatre actress
9 August – Abdi İpekçi, journalist
15 September – Mümtaz Soysal, academic, lawyer and politician
10 October – Ayten Alpman, singer
13 October – Adalet Ağaoğlu, novelist
30 November – Doğan Babacan, referee

Deaths
1 January – Mustafa Necati (born in 1894), minister of education and the founder of Public schools for the new alphabet (Nation's schools)  
15 September – Fehime Sultan (born 1875), Ottoman princess

Gallery

References

 
Years of the 20th century in Turkey